HD 41162 is a star in a double system.

References

External links
 HR 2137
 CCDM J06051+3757
 Image HD 41162

G-type giants
F-type main-sequence stars
Double stars
Auriga (constellation)
Durchmusterung objects
041162
028820
2137